Sidney Wolinsky is a Canadian-American (b. Winnipeg, Manitoba, Canada) film editor with over 30 credits beginning in 1983. He won the Primetime Emmy Award for Outstanding Single-Camera Picture Editing for a Drama Series for the pilot episode of Boardwalk Empire (2010). Earlier, his work on The Sopranos (1999–2007) earned him three Emmy nominations and two ACE Eddie Awards.

The son of sculptor Eva Stubbs and Hyman Wolinsky, he was born in Winnipeg, attended high school in Montreal and went to Brandeis University in Massachusetts. He received a master's degree in film from the Cinema Department at San Francisco State University and worked briefly for the Canadian Broadcasting Corporation in Toronto. He subsequently moved to Los Angeles. His parents are Jewish, and he had a Bar Mitzvah.

For the Guillermo del Toro drama The Shape of Water (2017), Wolinsky was nominated for the Academy Award for Best Film Editing, the BAFTA Award for Best Editing, the Critics' Choice Movie Award for Best Editing and several other accolades.

Filmography

References

External links
 

Canadian film editors
People from Winnipeg
Living people
Year of birth missing (living people)